The 2003 Super X Cup Tournament was an X Cup professional wrestling X Division tournament and pay-per-view event produced by Total Nonstop Action Wrestling (TNA), which took place on August 20, 2003 at the TNA Asylum in Nashville, Tennessee. It was aired on September 3 via tape delay.

The event featured the first-ever eight-man Super X Cup Tournament, which was won by Chris Sabin, who defeated Juventud Guerrera in the tournament final. Aside from the tournament, the event featured the first-ever Wednesday, Bloody Wednesday match as the main event, in which the team of D-Lo Brown, Jeff Jarrett, Raven and America's Most Wanted (Chris Harris and James Storm) defeated AJ Styles, Christopher Daniels, Johnny Swinger, Shane Douglas and Simon Diamond, with Erik Watts serving as the special guest referee.

Production

Background
The Super X Cup Tournament was an international tournament that featured X Division wrestlers from all over the world to compete in one-on-one matches, with the winner getting a shot at the TNA X Division Championship. The 2003 Super X Cup was the first X Cup Tournament of any kind for TNA Wrestling. Competitors from the United States, Canada, Mexico, Great Britain, and Japan wrestled in the Super X-Cup Tournament. Many of these competitors were brought back to TNA for future X Cup Tournaments.

Results

Tournament brackets

Various wrestlers from around the globe, including Chris Sabin, Juventud Guerrera, Nosawa, Teddy Hart, and Jonny Storm, among others, competed in the Super X Cup Tournament. Chris Sabin defeated Jerry Lynn, Frankie Kazarian, and finally Juventud Guerrera to capture the Super X Cup.
The tournament brackets were:

Aftermath

Short-term
Sabin challenged the X Division Champion Michael Shane to a match for Shane's X Division Championship and Sabin's Super X Cup was also on the line on October 8. Shane won the match to retain the title and win Sabin's Super X Cup trophy. However, Sabin is still officially recognized as the overall official winner of the 2003 Super X Cup.

Long-term
Since the debut of the 2003 Super X Cup Tournament, there have been various X Cup Tournaments held in TNA Wrestling throughout the years. Wrestlers from Total Nonstop Action Wrestling, Border City Wrestling, AAA, All Japan Pro Wrestling, New Japan Pro-Wrestling, and other promotions have competed in the various X Cup Tournaments that have been hosted by TNA.

See also
TNA X Cup Tournaments
TNA 2004 America's X Cup Tournament
TNA 2004 World X Cup Tournament
TNA 2005 Super X Cup Tournament
TNA 2006 World X Cup Tournament
TNA 2008 World X Cup Tournament

References

External links
TNAWrestling.com (Official Website of TNA Wrestling)

Impact Wrestling tournaments
TNA Super X Cup Tournament
Super X Cup Tournament
TNA Super X Cup Tournament
Professional wrestling in Nashville, Tennessee
TNA Super X Cup Tournament